Onychodactylus fischeri is a lungless salamander found in Northeast Asia. It ranges through northeastern China, the Russian Far East, and the Korean Peninsula, but is only sporadically distributed within this range. Within South Korea, it is found chiefly in the high mountain valleys of Gangwon province, including the Gwangdeoksan and Daeseongsan regions. The adults feed on spiders, grubs, and insects.  Common names include Fischer's clawed salamander and long-tailed clawed salamander.

It has 78 chromosomes in total (27 pairs of microchromosomes, six pairs of medium-sized chromosomes, and six pairs of large chromosomes).

Onychodactylus fischeri is known to live at elevations up to 1000 m, and favors thickly-vegetated stretches of pebble-bottomed mountain streams, with little direct sunlight. It may also be found near underground springs. The mating season is from mid-March to mid-May. The eggs are laid in streams; the aquatic larvae emerge after approximately 5 weeks. It is threatened by habitat change, such as tree felling in stream headwaters.

The adult males of the species are 17–18 cm long; adult females are slightly longer, 18–19 cm. The dorsal aspect is yellowish brown, with bands of dark brown spots throughout. The ventral aspect is lighter in color, without spots. The head is small, flat and oval. The skin is smooth overall, but with one groove running along the center of the back. The tail is longer than the head and body combined, a fact from which the salamander takes its common name.

References

External links

 [web application]. 2010. Berkeley, California: Onychodactylus fischeri. AmphibiaWeb, available at https://web.archive.org/web/20040827082534/http://www.amphibiaweb.org/ (Accessed: November 20, 2010).

fischeri
Amphibians described in 1886
Amphibians of China
Amphibians of Korea
Amphibians of Russia